The East Grinstead Open was a combined grass court tennis tournament held at the East Grinstead Lawn Tennis and Croquet Club(f.1882), East Grinstead, West Sussex, England from 1882 to 1939.

History
The East Grinstead Open tournament  was a men's and women's grass court tennis tournament first staged around 1882 at East Grinstead, West Sussex, England. In 1928 the East Grinstead Open had 128 entries for the gentlemen's singles event. The first winner of the men's  singles was England's William Nevill Cobbold. The first winner of the women's event was England's Mrs Baddington. The final known edition was in 1939 the men's  singles event was won by New Zealands's Alistair Dewar-Brown. and the women's singles title was won by Hungary's Suzy Kormoczy. It was a featured regular series category event on the Men's Amateur Tour (1877-1912).

Notable winners of this tournament included in the men's  singles; Charles Lacy Sweet (1884), James Dwight (1885), Wilfred Baddeley (1888), Herbert Baddeley (1889), Roy Allen (1904, 1909), Major Ritchie (1911), Gordon Lowe (1912), Brame Hillyard (1924), Paul Barrelet De Ricou(1927), Donald Leahong (1930), Vernon Kirby (1937) and Ian Collins (1938).

Former notable winners of women's singles title included; Blanche Bingley (1885), Hilda Lane (1903–06, 1908–09, 1911–13), Dorothy Holman (1921–1925), Joan Ridley (1928–30), Geraldine Ramsey Beamish (1931) and Ermyntrude Harvey (1935–36, 1938).

References

Defunct tennis tournaments in the United Kingdom
Grass court tennis tournaments
Tennis tournaments in England